The Chengdu J-20, also known as Mighty Dragon, is a twinjet all-weather stealth fighter aircraft developed by China's Chengdu Aerospace Corporation for the People's Liberation Army Air Force (PLAAF). The J-20 is designed as an air superiority fighter with precision strike capability. The aircraft has three variants: the initial production model J-20A, the thrust-vectoring J-20B, and twin-seat aircraft teaming capable J-20S.

Descending from the J-XX program of the 1990s, the aircraft made its maiden flight on 11 January 2011, and was officially revealed at the 2016 China International Aviation & Aerospace Exhibition. The aircraft entered service in March 2017 with the first J-20 combat unit formed in February 2018, making China the second country in the world and the first in Asia to field an operational stealth aircraft. The J-20 is the world's third operational fifth-generation fighter aircraft after the F-22 and F-35.

Development

The J-20 emerged from the late-1990s J-XX program. In 2008, the PLAAF endorsed Chengdu Aerospace Corporation's proposal, Project 718; Shenyang's proposed aircraft was larger than the J-20. Chengdu had previously used the double-canard configuration in the J-9, its first design and cancelled in the 1970s, and the J-10.

In 2009, a senior PLAAF official revealed that the first flight was expected in 2010–11, with a service entry date by 2019. On 22 December 2010, the first J-20 prototype underwent high speed taxiing tests outside the Chengdu Aircraft Design Institute (CADI). Three months later, the first J-20 prototype made its maiden flight in Chengdu. The first prototype was painted with the number "2001". In May 2012, the second prototype took flight in the CADI facility.

Several changes were made to the third J-20 prototype, numbered "2011", which made its maiden flight in March 2014. The new prototype showed increasing sophistication in design, including numerous subtle changes from the first two prototypes. The new airframe introduced modified diverterless supersonic inlet (DSI) intakes, stealth coating, streamlined underwing fairings, and redesigned vertical stabilizers. Analysts noted new equipment and devices for multi-role operations, such as integrated targeting pods for precision-guided munition, and six additional passive infrared sensors can also be spotted around the aircraft.

In December 2015, the low rate initial production (LRIP) version of the J-20 was spotted by military observers. The LRIP aircraft revealed dielectric surfaces that were previously painted for prototypes, potentially containing various sensors or baked-in radar absorbing materials.

In October 2017, Chinese state media reported that the designs of the J-20 had been finalized, and were ready for mass production as well as being combat-ready. In March 2018, Chinese military revealed other versions of the J-20 platform were being developed.

In January 2019, Chinese media reported that a twin-seat variant of the J-20 is rumored to be in development for use in tactical bombing, electronic warfare and carrier strike roles.

In November 2019, a J-20 painted in yellow primer coating was spotted during its flight testing by defense observers at the Chengdu Aerospace Corporation manufacturing facility. The aircraft is equipped with a new variant of WS-10 Taihang engines with serrated afterburner nozzles to enhance stealth. Report indicated Chengdu Aerospace Corporation terminated the manufacturing of J-20 with Russian engines in mid-2019.

Chinese media reported that a new variant of the J-20, the J-20B, was unveiled on July 8, 2020, and entered mass production the same day. The only change mentioned was that the J-20B was to be equipped with thrust vectoring control. Conflicting reports emerged regarding the exact engine type. Analyst Andreas Rupprecht expressed skepticism regarding the use of Russian engines on the J-20, as he believes that the J-20 is using a variant of the WS-10, which he called the WS-10C. This engine has improved thrust, stealthier serrated afterburner nozzles, and higher reliability, but it is not designed for thrust vectoring, unlike the WS-10 TVC demonstrated on a J-10 in 2018 China International Aviation & Aerospace Exhibition. Analyst Jamie Hunter believed the new engine type is what he called WS-10B-3, a Chinese-made thrust-vectoring engine demonstrated on the 2018 Zhuhai Airshow.

In January 2021, South China Morning Post reported that China would replace Russian engines on the J-20 stealth fighter with a type of Chinese engine called WS-10C. In June 2021, Chinese media confirmed that an aviation brigade is assigned with the enhanced J-20A variant that integrates domestic WS-10C engines. Despite the replacement, WS-10C is considered another interim solution before Xian WS-15 passes evaluations. Moreover, WS-10C will not be equipped on the J-20B, the thrust-vectoring version of the J-20 that entered mass production in 2019, which still required further testing. Overall, Chinese engineers believe WS-10C is comparable with AL-31F in performance, and the replacement would also reduce China's dependency on Russian engines. The WS-10C-powered J-20 has officially showcased to the public on 28 September 2021 at Zhuhai Airshow.

The development of a twin-seater variant was hinted by J-20's chief designer in 2019. In January 2021, Aviation Industry Corporation of China released computer renderings of the twin-seat variant of the J-20 fighter in celebration of the 10th anniversary of the jet's maiden flight. In February 2021, a South China Morning Post infographic depicted a twin-seat J-20 variant powered by thrust vectoring WS-10C. In October 2021, a taxiing prototype, dubbed J-20S by analysts, was spotted near Chengdu Aerospace Corporation facilities, making J-20S the first-ever two-seat stealth fighter. The twin-seat design allows the possibility for the second operator to coordinate attacks and reconnaissance missions from other friendly aircraft via networking or unmanned combat aerial vehicles (UCAVs) linked via "loyal wingman" systems and sensors. The advantage of a second operator includes the potential for better interpreting and exploiting the enormous sensory data that could overload the limited cognitive and processing capacity for a single human, especially in a contested air combat environment.

In March 2022, Chinese state media reported that the J-20 had performed trials with the WS-15 engine. In December 2022, Chinese military analysts indicated the WS-15 was undertaking the last stage of testing and development. In late December, a prototype of the new J-20 variant was observed at Chengdu Aerospace Corporation facilities. The new variant was painted in yellow premier and different from previous J-20 aircraft in airframe design, with a low-profile blended canopy, aiming to optimize transonic flight performance and maneuverability. The new prototype was speculated to be used to test the WS-15 engine and thrust-vectoring.

Design

Characteristics
The J-20 has a long and blended fuselage, with a chiseled nose section and a frameless canopy. Immediately behind the cockpit are low-observable diverterless supersonic inlet (DSI) intakes. All-moving canard surfaces with pronounced dihedral are placed behind the intakes, followed by leading edge extensions merging into the delta wing with forward-swept trailing edges. The aft section has twin outward canted all-moving fins, short but deep ventral strakes, and conventional or low-observable engine exhausts.

One important design criterion for the J-20 is high instability. This requires sustained pitch authority at a high angle of attack, in which a conventional tail-plane would lose effectiveness due to stalling. On the other hand, a canard can deflect opposite to the angle of attack, avoiding stall and thereby maintaining control. A canard design is also known to provide good supersonic performance, excellent supersonic and transonic turn performance, and improved short-field landing performance compared to the conventional delta-wing design.

Leading edge extensions and body lift are incorporated to enhance performance in a canard layout. This combination is said by the designer to generate 1.2 times the lift of an ordinary canard delta, and 1.8 times more lift than an equivalent-sized pure delta configuration. The designer claims such a combination allows the use of a smaller wing, reducing supersonic drag without compromising transonic lift-to-drag characteristics that are crucial to the aircraft's turn performance.

The use of a bubble canopy, extensive flight-control surfaces, and canard configuration for angle-of-attack control indicates J-20's intention to operate in air-superiority missions and within-visual-range engagements. Chief test pilot Li Gang describes the J-20 as having comparable maneuverability to the Chengdu J-10 while being significantly better at low-observable (LO) performance. The J-20 is a multirole air superiority fighter, with the interceptor role being just one of the options.

Avionics and cockpit

The J-20 avionics aim to obtain situational awareness through advanced sensor fusion while denying situational awareness to the adversary through stealth and electronic warfare. The J-20 features an integrated avionic suite consisting of multi-spectral sensors capable of providing omnidirectional coverage. Official information on the type of radar that J-20s use has not yet been released publicly. Some analysts believed that J-20s used Type 1475 (KLJ-5) active electronically scanned array (AESA) radar with 1856 transmit/receive modules, but more recent information revealed that this radar was designed for upgraded versions of the J-11D. Other analysts point out that, based on the nose cross-section of the J-20 and known data about a single transmit/receive module surface in the J-16's AESA radar system, J-20s likely contain 2000–2200 transmit/receive modules.

Prototypes after application "2011" and production models feature a revised nose section with an electro-optical/infra-red targeting system and an advanced communications suite on top of the aircraft, enabling it to datalink with other friendly platforms in service, such as airborne early-warning drones. Six electro-optic sensors called the Distributed Aperture System (similar to EODAS) can provide omnidirectional coverage for the pilot with a sensor fusion system combining the radar signal with the IR image to provide better situational awareness. The combination of an integrated targeting pod with a spherically-located passive-optical tracking system is reported, similar to the design concept of Lockheed Martin F-35's avionic suite. Beijing A Star Science and Technology has developed the EOTS-86 electro-optical targeting system and Electro-Optical Distributed Aperture System for the J-20, and potentially for other PLAAF fighters, to detect and intercept stealth aircraft.

The aircraft features a fully-digital glass cockpit with one primary large color liquid-crystal display (LCD) touchscreen, three smaller auxiliary displays, and a wide-angle holographic heads-up display (HUD). The aircraft is fitted with a helmet-mounted display (HMD) system, which displays combat information inside the pilots' helmet visor and facilities firing missiles at high off-boresight angle.

Armament
The main weapon bay is capable of housing both long-range air-to-air missiles (AAM; PL-12, PL-15 – PL-21) and precision-guided munitions (PGM; LS-6/50, LS-6/100), while the two smaller lateral weapon bays behind the air inlets are intended for short-range AAMs (PL-10). These side bays allow closure of the bay doors prior to firing the missile, enhancing stealth and allowing the missile to be fired in the shortest possible time. The J-20 reportedly lacks an internal autocannon or rotary cannon, suggesting the aircraft is not intended for use in short-range dogfight engagements with other aircraft but to engage from long standoff ranges with missiles such as the PL-15 and PL-21. The J-20 will likely use air-to-air missiles to engage in air superiority combat with other aircraft and to destroy high-value airborne assets. Supplemental missions may include launching anti-radiation missiles and air-to-ground munitions for precision-strike missions.

While the fighter typically carries weapons internally, the wings include four hardpoints for auxiliary fuel tanks to extend the ferrying range. However, much like the F-22, the J-20 is unlikely to carry fuel tanks on combat missions due to its vulnerability in such a configuration; the value of this configuration is relevant to such peacetime operations as transiting between airbases. The fighter is able to carry four medium/long-range AAMs in the main bay and one short-range missile in each lateral weapon bay. A staggered arrangement of six PL-15s is possible for potential future missile rail launchers.

Engines

The J-20 entered production powered by an improved Lyulka-Saturn AL-31 variant, reportedly the AL-31FM2 developed by Salyut.

The next interim engine was the Shenyang WS-10. The WS-10B reportedly powered low rate initial production aircraft in 2015, and was used as an interim engine before the adoption of the AL-31. There are conflicting reports concerning the powerplant of the TVC-equipped J-20B. The powerplant has been identified as the AL-31FM2, or a variant of the WS-10; "WS-10C" by Andreas Rupprecht, or "WS-10B-3" by Jamie Hunter. The TVC-equipped WS-10B-3 was demonstrated at the 2018 China International Aviation & Aerospace Exhibition.

The push to replace the AL-31 with the WS-10C followed the failure of the WS-15 to pass trials in 2019. Aircraft powered by WS-10Cs were flying by September 2019. The engine has a thrust of 142-147 kN, and has serrated afterburner nozzles for enhanced rear-aspect stealth. Flights with prototypes powered by the WS-10C were underway by November 2020. In June 2021, Chinese media confirmed that the WS-10C was powering operational J-20As. In January 2022, it was reported that aircraft powered by the WS-10C would be upgraded with TVC.

The intended powerplant is the Xian WS-15, with a thrust of 180 kN, which is required for supercruise. The engine's development was ongoing in 2019. In March 2022, Chinese state media reported that the J-20 had performed trials with the engine and experienced significantly improved performance. It was also reported that eventually new production and existing aircraft powered by the AL-31 would be fitted with the WS-15.

The aircraft is equipped with a retractable refueling probe embedded on the right side of the cockpit, to help the fighter to maintain stealth while flying greater distances.

Stealth
Analysts noted that the J-20's airframe employs a holistic approach to reduce its radar cross-section (RCS), uniquely combining canard wings with leading edge root extensions (LERX). The chined forebody, modified radar radome, and electroconductive canopy use a stealth shaping, yielding signature performance in a mature design similar to the F-22. The diverterless supersonic inlets (DSI) leading into serpentine inlets (S-ducts) can obscure the reflective surface of the engine from radar detection. DSI intakes save weight, reduce complexity, and minimize radar signature. Additional low-observable features include a flat fuselage bottom holding an internal weapons bay, sawtooth edges on compartment doors, mesh coverings on cooling ports at the base of the vertical tails, embedded antennas, and radar-absorbent coating materials. While the aircraft's fins/strakes and axisymmetric rear areas may expose the aircraft to radar, the overall stealth shaping is robust and considerably more capable than the Russian PAK-FA. Improvements regarding stealth were subsequently introduced - one prototype in 2014 was powered by WS-10 engines equipped with different jagged-edge nozzles and tiles for greater stealth. The J-20 production model with the serrated WS-10C engine is also capable of mitigating negative effects on rear-aspect stealth.

Others have raised doubts about the use of canards on a low-observable design, stating that canards would guarantee radar detection and compromise stealth. However, these critiques with respect to the canards' RCS may be unfounded. Canards and low-observability are not necessarily mutually exclusive designs. Northrop Grumman's proposal for the U.S. Navy's Advanced Tactical Fighter (ATF) incorporated canards on a stealthy airframe. Lockheed Martin employed canards on a stealth airframe for the Joint Advanced Strike Technology (JAST) program during early development before dropping them due to complications with aircraft carrier recovery. McDonnell Douglas and NASA's X-36 featured canards and was considered to be extremely stealthy. Radar cross-section can be further reduced by controlling canard deflection through flight-control software, as on the Eurofighter. Similarly, Chinese aerospace researchers also concluded that, in terms of stealth, the canard delta configuration is comparable with the conventional arrangement. Defense observer Rick Joe believes J-20's configuration is stealthy, while there is a lack of evidence for the popular assumption of canards' inherent incompatibility with stealth.

Composite materials are applied to minimize the J-20's radar-cross sections. The diverterless supersonic inlet (DSI) enables an aircraft to reach Mach 2.0 with a simpler intake than traditionally required, and improves stealth performance by eliminating radar reflections between the diverter and the aircraft's skin. Analysts have also noted that the J-20 DSI reduces the need for the application of radar-absorbent materials. A removable radar reflectors (Luneburg lens) is mounted on the underside of the J-20 to amplify its radar returns, concealing the real radar signature. In the 2021 production model, the emitter is re-engineered to be retractable.

In May 2018, Indian Air Chief Marshal B.S. Dhanoa claimed at a press conference that the radars on India's Su-30MKI fighters were "good enough" and could detect a J-20 from "several kilometers away" while answering a question on whether the J-20 posed a threat to India. Analyst Justin Bronk from Royal United Services Institute noted that Chinese were possibly flying the J-20 with radar reflectors during peacetime for safety and training purposes due to the potential for accidents and identification from other aircraft or ground installations. In a more recent report, Bronk also states that even with limited stealth, J-20 could hide and strike enemy critical platforms in an airspace with background clutter caused by non-stealth fighters and other electromagnetic noise. Despite debate regarding J-20's stealth capability, military analysts agree that the J-20's stealth design is superior to that of the Russian Su-57 and its stealth profile could be further enhanced as the program matures.

Operational history

Flight testing
On 10 December 2010, the first J-20 prototype was observed undertaking high speed taxiing tests around the Chengdu Aircraft Design Institute (CADI) facilities before the maiden flight.

On 11 January 2011, the first J-20 prototype (numbered "2001") made its first flight, lasting about 15 minutes, with a Chengdu J-10B serving as the chase aircraft. After the successful flight, a ceremony was held, attended by the pilot, Li Gang, Chief Designer Yang Wei and General Li Andong, Deputy-Director of General Armaments. On 17 April 2011, a second test flight of an hour and 20 minutes took place. On 5 May 2011, a 55-minute test flight was held that included retraction of the landing gear. On 26 February 2012, the first prototype J-20 performed various low-altitude maneuvers.

On 10 May 2012, the second prototype (numbered "2002") underwent high-speed taxiing tests, and flight testing that began later that month. On 20 October 2012, photographs of the prototype with open compartment doors and a modified pitot tube emerged, suggesting the possible inclusion of radar or sensors. In March 2013, images of the side weapon bays appeared, displaying a missile launch rail.

On 16 January 2014, the third J-20 prototype was revealed, showing new intakes, embedded engine nozzles, and stealth coating, as well as redesigned vertical stabilizers, and an Electro-Optical Targeting System. This particular aircraft, numbered "2011", performed its maiden flight on 1 March 2014 and is said to represent the initial pre-serial standard.

By the end of 2014, three more pre-serial prototypes were flown, each with incremental improvements to the design. The fourth prototype "2012" was tested on 26 July 2014, sharing many similarities with the "2011". This pair of aircraft was reportedly powered by AL-31FM2 engines. The fifth prototype, numbered "2013", took off on 29 November 2014. Three weeks later, number "2015" made its maiden flight on 19 December 2014, indicating rapid construction capability. Both prototypes featured retractable aerial refueling probes and infrared-suppression engine nozzles. The sixth prototype "2015" featured a slight alteration to tail booms, suggesting the installation of rear-facing sensors. Chinese Air Force also modified an airliner to serve as the AESA radar test-bed for the J-20 program.

On 13 September 2015, a new prototype, marked "2016", began testing. It had noticeable improvements, such as apparently modified DSI bumps on the intakes. The DSI changes suggested the possibility of more powerful engines being used than its predecessors, likely to be an advanced 14-ton thrust derivative of the Russian AL-31 or Chinese Shenyang WS-10 turbofan engines. By 2020, the J-20 is scheduled to use the 18–19 ton WS-15 engine, enabling the jet to supercruise without using afterburners. The trapezoidal flight booms around the engines were further enlarged, possibly to accommodate rearwards-facing radars, electronic countermeasures, and jamming equipment. The fuselage was extended to the engine's exhaust nozzles. Compared to its "2014" and "2015" predecessors, the engine's surface area is further embedded inside the stealthy coating, providing greater rear-facing stealth against enemy detection.

On 24 November 2015, a new J-20 prototype, numbered "2017", took to the sky. The most significant change in the new prototype was the reshaped cockpit canopy, which provides the pilot with greater visibility. The lack of other design changes suggested that "2017" is very close to the final J-20 production configuration. Since '2017' was likely the last J-20 prototype, the low rate initial production (LRIP) of the J-20 is likely to begin in 2016. Chinese media reported that the design of the J-20 was frozen and finalized, as formal ceremonies were held for the prototype "2017" after completing the flight testing. The LRIP version later appeared in December 2015.

In March 2017, Chinese media reported that the fighter entered service. But it still faced a series of technical challenges that needed to be tackled, including the reliability of its WS-15 engines, the aircraft's flight control system, stealth coatings, hull materials, and infrared sensor. In September 2017, a newly-built J-20 prototype (numbered "2021") was flight testing with Chinese-made WS-10 Taihang engines, featuring sawtoothed serration edge on its afterburning nozzles. The J-20 with indigenous WS-10C engines began production in 2019.

In September 2018, it was reported that issues with the development of the WS-15 engine, particularly the reliability of the turbine blades overheating at top speeds were fixed. The WS-15 reportedly required further development after failing final verification testing at the end of 2019. The COVID-19 pandemic imposed further delays. In March 2022, Chinese state media reported that the WS-15 engine completed final testing.

In November 2021, the US military reported that the J-20 was gradually receiving upgrades. In the same month, new J-20 two-seater variant began flight testing.

In December 2022, the prototype "2051" in yellow premier coat took flight. The new prototype had a redesigned canopy section and was speculated to be used to test the WS-15 engine and thrust-vectoring

Production
In late December 2015, a new J-20 numbered 2101 was spotted; it is believed to be the LRIP version of the aircraft. Chinese media suggested the stealth aircraft will enter production ahead of schedule. In July 2016, pre-production models with dark-grey paint and low visibility insignias were spotted inside a Chengdu Aerospace Corporation (CAC) facility. The production rate indicated an intended initial operational capability (IOC) date of around 2017-2018.

In October 2017, Chinese media reported that CAC initiated the serial production for the J-20 and is on a path towards achieving full operational capability with the People's Liberation Army Air Force (PLAAF). State media described the CAC's production rate as "stable", meaning achieving a regular production rate for minimal economies of scale. The production rate was expected to be three aircraft per month.

In 2019, Chengdu Aerospace Corporation began manufacturing J-20 fitted with Chinese-made WS-10 Taihang engines. J-20s manufactured after mid-2019 were no longer fitted with Russian AL-31F turbofan engines. In June 2021, J-20A with Chinese-made WS-10C engines were incorporated into active service. The production rate of J-20 was expected to be further increased. In January 2022, analyst Derek Solen estimated 50 to 74 fighters were in service based on open-source intelligence. In August 2022, Li Xiaobing reported that over 150 had been delivered; claims of 150 being in service had been made in 2021.

In November 2022, high-resolution photos revealed over 200 J-20 fighters had been manufactured. According to analyst Andreas Rupprecht, a total of four batches of J-20 have been delivered with 18, 46, 56, and 70 airframes for each shipment based on his conservative estimate. The new pictures also indicated significantly improved manufacturing tolerance and quality control. According to the Chinese military, Chengdu Aircraft Corporation accelerated the manufacturing and delivery of the J-20 fighter due to the implementation of pulse assembly line. Chinese military analysts believed the initiative aimed to counter-balance the increasing numbers of F-35 fighters deployed by the United States in Asia.

Training
Pilot training for the J-20 started as early as March 2017, after the fighter entered limited service in the initial operational capability (IOC) phase. During the IOC phase, the fighters are equipped with radar reflectors, also known as Luneburg lens, to enlarge and conceal the actual radar cross-section.

The J-20 participated in its first combat exercise in January 2018, practicing beyond-visual-range maneuvers against China's fourth-generation fighters such as J-16 and J-10C. The exercise was reported to be realistic.  Training with mixed generations allows pilots to become familiar with fifth-generation aircraft, and to develop tactics both for and against them. Chinese Ministry of National Defense also revealed that J-20 has conducted night confrontation missions during several coordinated tactical training exercises.

The J-20 participated in its first over-ocean combat exercise in May 2018.

In April 2022, the J-20 is confirmed to be engaged in regular maritime portals in the East China Sea and the South China Sea for routine training missions, in a statement released by the Chengdu Aircraft Corporation.

Deployment
On 12 December 2016, at least six J-20s were observed in PLAAF air bases, with tail numbers 78271-78276 identified. Another six were believed to be ready for delivery by the end of December 2016.
On 9 March 2017, Chinese media revealed that the J-20 had entered service in the Chinese air force, making China the second country in the world—after the United States—and the first in Asia to field an operational fifth-generation stealth aircraft. Chinese National Defense Ministry confirmed the service status in September 2017. It is anticipated that frontline units could be equipped with the low observable combat aircraft before 2020. The International Institute for Strategic Studies (IISS) proposed that, as the trend continues, the US could lose its monopoly on operational stealth aircraft.

The PLAAF began inducting J-20s into combat units in February 2018, one month after its first combat drill. The aircraft entered service with the 9th Air Brigade based at Wuhu Air Base, Anhui province in late 2018 – March 2019, replacing Su-30MKK fighters previously deployed there.

On 27 August 2019, the Central Military Commission of the People's Liberation Army approved the J-20 as the PLAN's future primary fighter, beating out the Shenyang FC-31. Arguments for the J-20 state that the plane is far more advanced, longer-ranged, and carries a heavier payload than the FC-31, while those supporting the FC-31 argued that it is cheaper, lighter, and far more maneuverable than the J-20. The J-20 would likely be commissioned upon the Type 003 aircraft carrier under construction, however, the length of the J-20 means that it has to be shortened to be considered operable on an aircraft carrier.

On 26 June 2021, Chinese state media reported that J-20 fighters were deployed to PLAAF units monitoring East China Sea and Taiwan Strait. Analysts suggested that the Chinese Air Force aimed to equip at least one to two brigades in each of the five theater commands before 2026. On 19 April 2022, satellites image indicated that all five theater commands had equipped with J-20A fighters, which was later confirmed by the Chinese Air Force spokesperson on a press release in September.

In March 2022, the United States Air Force (USAF) general Kenneth Wilsbach confirmed that USAF F-35s have encountered J-20s deployed over the East China Sea.

In April 2022, Chinese state media reported J-20 started regular patrol in the South China Sea.

Variants

J-20A
J-20A is the first production variant of the J-20 platform. Flight testing began with prototypes in late 2010, with maiden flight in 2011. The variant entered serial production in October 2017. J-20A was incorporated into training units of the People's Liberation Army Air Force in March 2017 and combat units in February 2018.

J-20B
Improved J-20 variant with thrust-vectoring control (TVC) engines. The variant entered production on 8 July 2020. Early batch received Shenyang WS-10B-3 TVC engines, while the intended powerplant is the thrust vectoring, supercruise capable WS-15.

J-20S
The twin-seat variant of J-20, named J-20S, J-20AS or J-20B by defense analysts, is a version of J-20 in development. J-20S was first spotted in October 2021, taxiing inside a Chengdu Aircraft Corporation facility in yellow primer paint and untreated composite, making it the first twin-seat stealth fighter in the world.

The twin-seat design allows the possibility for the second operator to conduct airborne early warning and control (AEW&C) missions, which J-20 would leverage its avionics and networking capability to provide battlespace surveillance, battle management, and intelligence analysis. The stealth fighter could act as a more survivable and distributed alternative to traditional airborne warning and command post aircraft. Another possibility is to coordinate attacks and reconnaissance missions from unmanned combat aerial vehicles (UCAVs) linked via "loyal wingman" systems and sensors. China is known to be developing various "loyal wingman" prototypes such as AVIC Dark Sword. In addition to aircraft teaming, a twin-seat configuration may also provide marginal benefits in pilot training and strike missions.

The advantage of a second operator includes the potential for better interpreting and exploiting the enormous sensory data, which could overload the limited cognitive and processing capacity of a single human. The back-seater operator would focus on managing the manned or unmanned aircraft fleet, reducing the pilot's workload in a contested air combat environment. With increased automation and artificial intelligence in the aircraft system, the two men crew would likely be able to delegate more complex AEW&C tasks, absorb information, and make tactical decisions.

In August 2022, a Chinese defense publication suggested the twin-seat variant could be used as an electronic warfare platform. In October 2022, Chinese media showcased the concept of the J-20 two-seater controlling stealth Hongdu GJ-11 unmanned combat aerial vehicle, and the back seat is designated for the weapons officer. It could also potentially manage the LJ-1, a low-end modular drone platform.

Strategic implications

Political
The first test flight coincided with a visit by United States Secretary of Defense Robert Gates to China, and was initially interpreted by the Pentagon as a possible signal to the visiting US delegation. Speaking to reporters in Beijing, secretary Gates said, "I asked President Hu about it directly, and he said that the test had absolutely nothing to do with my visit and there had been a pre-planned test." Hu seemed surprised by Gates' inquiry. Abraham M. Denmark of the Center for New American Security in Washington, along with Michael Swaine, an expert on the PLA and United States–China military relations, explained that senior officials are not involved in the day-to-day management of aircraft development and were unaware of the test.

Military
Robert Gates downplayed the significance of the aircraft by questioning how stealthy the J-20 may be, but stated the J-20 would "put some of our capabilities at risk, and we have to pay attention to them, we have to respond appropriately with our own programs." The U.S. Director of National Intelligence James R. Clapper testified that the United States knew about the program for a long time and that the test flight was not a surprise.

In 2011, Loren B. Thompson (Lexington Institute), echoed by a 2015 RAND Corporation report, felt that J-20's combination of forward stealth and long-range puts America's surface assets at risk and that a long-range maritime strike capability may cause the United States more concern than a short-range air-superiority fighter like the F-22. In its 2011 Annual Report to Congress, the Pentagon described the J-20 as "a platform capable of long-range, penetrating strikes into complex air defense environments." A 2012 report by the U.S.‐China Economic and Security Review Commission suggests that the United States may have underestimated the speed of development of the J-20 and several other Chinese military development projects.

In the early 2010s, Western observers were not able to reach a consensus on the J-20's primary role or its specific capabilities. Experts and analysts called into question many of China's claims and stated it was considered a low observability aircraft but did not fall in the category of a true stealth aircraft based on U.S. Military standards.

After the deployment announcement in 2018, several analysts noted that the experience that the PLAAF will gain with the J-20 would give China a significant edge over India, Japan, and South Korea, which have struggled to design and produce their own fifth-generation fighters on schedule. However, despite the failure of their indigenous projects, Japan and South Korea would soon operate the imported F-35A in 2019 equipped with better situational awareness and jet propulsion technology, negating this potential technological disparity. United States Marine Corps created a full-scale replica (FSR) of a Chengdu J-20 in December 2018. The replica was spotted parked outside the Air Dominance Center at Savannah/Hilton Head International Airport in Georgia. The United States Marine Corps later confirmed that the aircraft was built for training.

By 2019, aviation researchers believed that the progress of J-20 signified that China had surpassed Russia in the application of contemporary aviation technologies such as composite materials, advanced avionics, and long-range weapons systems. According to Justin Bronk of the Royal United Services Institute, the J-20 is one of the examples of how China has transitioned from the dependency of Russian technology to developing indigenous sensors and weapons that are superior to those of Russia; and how China is beginning to build a clear lead over Russia in most aspects of combat aircraft development in the 2020s. The J-20 also symbolizes that the Western Bloc is losing the monopoly on stealth fighter technologies.

In March 2022, the United States Air Force (USAF) general Kenneth Wilsbach described J-20s were flying professionally and he is "relatively impressed" with the Chinese command and control structure and AEW&C capabilities after confirming two nations had an encounter in South China Sea. In a separate comment, the general mentioned the E-3 Sentry AEW&C aircraft is insufficient for timely detection of the J-20s. In another press conference, Wilsbach downplayed his earlier remarks, saying himself will not "lose sleep about the J-20", but added the United States should keep the innovation pace in the development of sixth-generation fighter technologies to "not lose sleep". He later added that the United States knows China is on schedule for its 6th-generation fighter program.

Defense media
Western sources contribute the idea that J-20 is optimized for anti-access/area denial (A2/AD) engagements, while Chinese sources universally describe J-20 as an air-superiority fighter meant to engage other fighters. Rod Lee, research director at the China Aerospace Studies Institute of the Air University, believes J-20 is intended to be primarily used for destroying high-value airborne assets, which is an alternative way of establishing air superiority. Supplemental missions may include launching anti-radiation missiles and air-to-ground munitions. Rod Lee believes J-20 has the maneuverability to engage in air superiority combat with other aircraft, but PLAAF has de-emphasized the traditional attrition warfare while advocating the "systems destruction" approach because they believe it is more effective.

Matthew Jouppi of Aviation Week noted the ill-informed assumptions that existed in defense circles and argued that the United States has not adequately addressed threats posed by the increasing Chinese airpower.

The visual, physical configuration and stealth shaping have been claimed to be influenced by foreign aircraft, including the F-22, F-35, F-117, Mig 1.44, Mig-31, Rafale, and Eurofighter Typhoon, according to an opinion piece published in The Diplomat by Rick Joe. Joe adds that the J-20's external physical configuration is a logical development of Chengdu's previous canard-delta designs: the Chengdu J-9 - particularly the "twin tail, side intake, canard delta" J-9V-II - from the 1960s and 1970s, and the Chengdu J-10. Furthermore, Joe said that stealth shaping is a much more universal and consistent trait that leaves limited room for variety, and that future international designs will likely reflect this.

Operators

People's Liberation Army Air Force – 208+ in service as of 2022
1st Fighter Brigade, Anshan Air Base, Liaoning
5th Fighter Brigade, Guilin Air Base, Guangxi
9th Fighter Brigade, Wuhu Air Base, Anhui
111th Fighter Brigade, Korla Airbase, Xinjiang
172nd Aviation Regiment, Cangzhou Airbase, Hebei; testing and training unit
176th Aviation Brigade, Dingxin Airbase, Gansu; testing and training unit

Specifications (J-20A)

See also

Notes

References

Sources 

 
 Kopp, Carlo. "The Strategic Impact of China's J-XX (J-20) Stealth Fighter."  Air Power Australia NOTAM #70, 9 January 2011.
 Kopp, Carlo and Peter A. Goon. "Chengdu J-XX (J-20) Stealth Fighter Prototype; A Preliminary Assessment."  ausairpower.net Technical Report APA-TR-2011-0101, January 2011.
 Rupprecht, Andreas. "Enter the Dragon: The Chengdu J-20." Combat Aircraft Monthly, (Ian Allan Publishing), Issue 12/3, March 2011, pp. 34–41.
 Sweetman, Bill. Lockheed Stealth. Minneapolis, Minnesota: Zenith Press, 2005. .

External links

 AirForceWorld.com – J-20 Photos and Introduction
 YouTube.com – The Latest J-20 Flight Test

2010s Chinese fighter aircraft
J-20
Stealth aircraft
Canard aircraft
Twinjets
Delta-wing aircraft
Aircraft first flown in 2011